Rudnik pri Moravčah is a settlement west of Moravče in central Slovenia. The area is part of the traditional region of Upper Carniola. It is now included with the rest of the Municipality of Moravče in the Central Slovenia Statistical Region.

Name
Rudnik pri Moravčah was attested in historical sources as Rvdnik in 1301, Rudnik in 1414, and Rüdnikh in 1475. The name of the settlement was changed from Rudnik to Rudnik pri Moravčah in 1953.

Church

The local church, built on Hribce Hill south of the settlement, is dedicated to Our Lady of Sorrows and belongs to the Parish of Moravče. It was  built after the 1895 earthquake on the site of an older chapel.

References

External links

Rudnik pri Moravčah on Geopedia

Populated places in the Municipality of Moravče